Chromolaena geraniifolia, the geraniumleaf thoroughwort, is a West Indian species of flowering shrub in the family Asteraceae. It is native to the Commonwealth of Puerto Rico, part of the United States.

Chromolaena geraniifolia is a shrub up to 150 cm (5 feet) high. It produces blue flower heads at the ends of branches.

The epithet geraniifolia means "with leaves like those of a Geranium."

References

geraniifolia
Flora of Puerto Rico
Plants described in 1899
Flora without expected TNC conservation status